The Dutch Furniture Awards is a former annual furniture design competition in the Netherlands, organized from 1985 to 1998. This was an initiative of the Jaarbeurs Utrecht and the Vereniging van Vakbeurs Meubel (VVM).

Overview  
This design prize was awarded annually. In 1985 it started with three prices for furniture designs: the Award for the best Dutch furniture design, the Style prize, and the Furniture of the year. In the following year a fourth prize was introduced, the Prize for Young Designers. In recent years, the Style for Industrial Product Quality replaced the style prize.

In addition to a main prize, each category has already been awarded one or more honorable mentions each year. Also, with some regularity, a grand prize was not awarded in a certain category if the jury felt that the product quality in that particular category had not been sufficient that year.

The entries of the Dutch Furniture Awards were exhibited annually. This was for a longer time at an annual International Furniture Fair in the Utrecht Fair. In 1997 this was at the Kunsthal Rotterdam, and at the Woonbeurs in the Prins Bernhardhoeve in Zuidlaren. In 1998 the ceremony took place in the Naardense Promerskazerne. The last presentation in 1999 took place again in the Jaarbeurs during the Interdecor home exhibition in Utrecht.

The jury 
The jury usually consisted of three people per category with a well-known designer and a furniture manufacturer, regularly supplemented by past prize winners. Known permanent judges were Sem Aardewerk, Willem van Ast, Gerard van den Berg, Jan des Bouvrie, Rob Eckhardt, Ton Haas and Jan Pesman.

Other jury members included Thijs Asselbergs in 1985, and Karel Boonzaaijer

Award winners 1985-1999

See also 
 Dutch Design
 Dutch Design Awards
 Dutch design week
 Rotterdam Design Award

References 

Design awards
Dutch awards
Dutch design
1985 establishments in the Netherlands
Awards established in 1985